No Good Deed is a 2002 American crime thriller film directed by Bob Rafelson, his last feature film. It stars Samuel L. Jackson, Milla Jovovich, Stellan Skarsgård and Doug Hutchison. The screenplay by Christopher Cannan and Steve Barancik is based on the short story "The House in Turk Street" by Dashiell Hammett. The original music score is by Jeff Beal.

It was entered into the 24th Moscow International Film Festival.

Plot

Jack Friar is a police detective who, while doing a friend a favor and searching for a runaway teenager on Turk Street, stumbles upon a bizarre band of criminals about to pull off a bank robbery. Jack finds himself being held hostage while the criminals decide what to do with him, and the leader's beautiful girlfriend Erin is left alone to watch Jack.

Erin, who is a master manipulator of the men in the gang, reveals another side to Jack – a melancholy romantic who could have been a classical cellist. She finds Jack's captivity an irresistible turn-on and he cannot figure out if she is being honest or if she is manipulating him as well. Before the gang returns, Jack and Erin's connection intensifies, leaving the fate of the money in question.

Main cast
 Samuel L. Jackson as Jack Friar
 Milla Jovovich as Erin
 Stellan Skarsgård as Tyrone Abernathy
 Doug Hutchison as Hoop
 Joss Ackland as Mr. Thomas Quarre
 Grace Zabriskie as Mrs. Karen Quarre
 Jonathan Higgins as David Brewster
 Shannon Lawson as Amy
 Robert Welch as Willy

Awards 
Bob Rafelson was nominated for a prize at the Moscow International Film Festival in 2002.

See also
Samuel L. Jackson filmography
List of films featuring diabetes

References

External links
 
 
 
 

2002 films
2002 crime thriller films
American heist films
American independent films
Films directed by Bob Rafelson
German independent films
Films based on works by Dashiell Hammett
American crime thriller films
German crime thriller films
2002 independent films
English-language German films
2000s English-language films
2000s American films
2000s German films